Skybound is a 1935 American action film directed by Raymond K. Johnson and starring Lloyd Hughes, Edward J. Nugent and Lona Andre. It was produced as an independent second feature on Poverty Row and distributed by Puritan Pictures. The film's sets were designed by the art director Vin Taylor.

Synopsis
A gang of smugglers hoping to outwit Captain John Kent, a pilot with United States Border Patrol, use an attractive nightclub singer to try and trick his younger brother Doug into assisting them.

Cast
 Lloyd Hughes as 	Capt. John Kent
 Edward J. Nugent as 	Doug Kent 
 Lona Andre as 	Teddy Blaine
 Grant Withers as 	Chet Morley
 Claire Rochelle as 	Marion Kent 
 John Cowell as 	Clyde Faber
 Harry Harvey as 	George Duncan
 Sam Lufkin as William Saunders
 Loren Rowell as 	Maj. Duncan
 Mabel Mason as 	Cafe Cashier
 Jack Gardner as 	Patrol Flyer
 Robert Dillon as Patrol Flyer
 Jack Cheatham as 	Joe - Patrol Flyer
 John Fox Stone as 	Patrol Flyer
 Jerry Rousseau as 	Patrol Flyer
 Dick Curtis as 	Master of Ceremonies
 Ralph Dawson as 	Plainclothesman
 Doris Karns as Cigarette Girl
 Herb Vigran as Grant - Mechanic

References

Bibliography
 Pitts, Michael R. Poverty Row Studios, 1929–1940. McFarland & Company, 2005.

External links
 

1935 films
1930s action films
American action films
Films directed by Raymond K. Johnson
American black-and-white films
1930s English-language films
1930s American films